Laura Harris is a Canadian actress.

Early life
Harris is the daughter of schoolteachers. She began acting in radio dramas and animation series when she was five years old. As a child Harris was educated at Crofton House School and attended college through UC correspondence. After working  nearly 14 years in television, she broke into feature film acting as a teenager.

Career
Harris is known for her roles as Grim Reaper Daisy Adair in the cable series Dead Like Me and as Marie Warner in the spy drama 24. Her film career dates back to 1990 when she appeared in an adaptation of Stephen King's It as Loni. She appeared as Marybeth Louise Hutchinson in The Faculty in 1998.

In 2006, Laura Harris starred as Maggie in a British-German horror film called Severance, directed by Christopher Smith, and written by Smith and James Moran.

In the summer of 2009, she co-starred in the internationally co-produced science fiction series Defying Gravity as Zoe Barnes.

She has also done voice-overs in animated TV shows including The New Adventures of Beany and Cecil, Astonishing X-Men, Hulk and the Agents of S.M.A.S.H. and My Little Pony Tales.

She is sometimes credited as Elizabeth Harris and Laura E. Harris.

Filmography

References

External links

Bio at angelfire.com

Canadian child actresses
Canadian film actresses
Canadian television actresses
Canadian voice actresses
Living people
20th-century Canadian actresses
21st-century Canadian actresses
1976 births